Halls of Montezuma is a 1951 American World War II war film directed by Academy Award-winner Lewis Milestone and starring Richard Widmark. It also stars Robert Wagner in his first credited screen role and features Richard Boone in his feature-film debut. The story is about U.S. Marines fighting on a Japanese-held island, and the title is a reference to the opening line from the Marines' Hymn.

Real color combat footage from the war in the Pacific was incorporated into the film's cinematography, 
and scenes at Camp Pendleton, California, were filmed on location with the full cooperation of the Marines.

The film was referred to in M*A*S*H (1970), directed by Robert Altman.

Plot
During World War II, a Marine battalion prepares to land on a large Japanese-held island in the Pacific. Lieutenant Colonel Gilfillan warns the men that it will be a tough mission, and that they have been ordered to take prisoners in order to gain information about the Japanese fortifications. Below deck, veteran Lieutenant Carl A. Anderson, a chemistry teacher in civilian life, questions his former student, Corporal Stuart Conroy, who complains that he is ill and cannot fight. Carl assures him that he has shown courage before and can do so again. In the landing boat heading to shore, Navy corpsman C. E. "Doc" Jones is worried because Carl has been suffering from "psychological migraines" for months. Carl and his platoon have been fighting since Guadalcanal, and now only seven men remain of the original platoon. Although Doc urged Carl to seek treatment in the United States, Anderson refuses to leave his men and has been relying on Doc to supply him with painkillers.

The men hit the beach and successfully dig in, despite an initial burst of resistance. As four days pass, the seven old-timers in Anderson's platoon, including Doc, Pigeon Lane, Sergeant Zelenko, Slattery, Coffman, and the unstable Riley "Pretty Boy" Duncannon, grow weary of the constant threat of hidden Japanese snipers. One day, the men try to take a ridge of hills, but are beaten back by Japanese rockets, which come as an unpleasant surprise to the commanding officers. When Coffman, who Carl saved from drowning at Tarawa is killed, Carl is forced to take some more of Doc's pills.

Anderson meets with other officers at battalion headquarters, where Gilfillan recounts the troubles they are having capturing prisoners and getting information from them. Sergeant Randolph Johnson, a Japanese-speaking linguist who uses psychology in interrogating prisoners, questions a POW who has been dubbed "Willie". As Gilfillan receives orders to stop the rockets within nine hours, before the next assault on the hills, Willie informs Johnson that the Japanese soldiers holding a cave stronghold are willing to surrender. Accompanied by Randolph, and war correspondent Sergeant Dickerman, Carl leads a patrol with the six remaining old-timers and replacement Whitney, to the cave, but they are ambushed and Zelenko is blinded.

The men capture the remaining Japanese, including a wounded officer, three laborers and a shell-shocked, elderly civilian. Carl finds a map on the wounded officer. On the return trip, a sniper shoots at Pretty Boy, who kills him during hand-to-hand combat. The confrontation further unbalances him and he attempts to murder the prisoners. Lane then accidentally shoots and kills Pretty Boy while attempting to stop him. Doc also dies from a wound in the shoulder, but not before giving Dickerman a message for Carl.

Anderson takes his prisoners to headquarters, where the wounded officer commits hara-kiri with a knife he stole from Randolph. While map expert Lieutenant Butterfield works on a Japanese map overlay found in Pretty Boy's personal effects, Carl and Randolph learn that one of the POWs is actually a highly educated officer, and famous Japanese baseball player before the war, pretending to be a private. From the officer's cryptic statements, he speaks perfect English, together with statements made from the officer who committed suicide, Randolph deduces where the rockets are located, and Lieutenant Butterfield matches the location on the map. When Carl and Dickerman make their way back to the platoon, they learn from Slattery that Conroy has been killed. Carl takes the news hard, questions the meaning of their sacrifice, and is ready to give up. Dickerman reads aloud Doc's note, however, and Carl, inspired by Doc's appeal for him to be strong for the sake of those whom he survives and the reciting of the Lord's Prayer by Whitney, throws away his painkillers, smashing them with the butt of his weapon, and again leads his men into battle. Then, as the film closes, U.S. Navy F4U Corsairs fly in and smash the Japanese position, which they were able to attack based on Carl's men's efforts, Carl screams to the advancing troops: "Give 'em Hell," which they echo in unison.

Cast
 Richard Widmark as Lt. Carl A. Anderson
 Jack Palance as Pigeon Lane (as Walter {Jack} Palance)
 Reginald Gardiner as Sgt. Randolph Johnson
 Robert Wagner as Private Coffman
 Karl Malden as Doc
 Richard Hylton as Conroy
 Richard Boone as Lt. Col. Gilfillan
 Skip Homeier as Pretty Boy
 Don Hicks as Lt. Butterfield
 Jack Webb as Correspondent Sgt. Dickerman
 Bert Freed as Slattery
 Neville Brand as Sgt. Zelenko
 Martin Milner as Whitney
 Philip Ahn as Nomura

Production

Casting
According to a January 1949 Los Angeles Times, actors Dana Andrews, Anne Baxter and Paul Douglas were originally set to star in the picture. However, they were not cast in the film.

Filming 
The film used various locations around Camp Pendleton and the adjacent Pacific coast for the landing scenes. The USMC also provided accurate military equipment, such as weapons, tanks and uniforms, as well as providing the manpower to create the logistics of a wartime U.S. Marine battalion.

USMC also provided expertise by assigning  three time decorated, Major George A. Gilliland, as Technical Advisor for the film.He was the recipient of two Bronze Stars and a Purple Heart.

Direction
This was the last American-made World War II film directed by Lewis Milestone. After the Halls of Montezuma, he made films in Europe as well as other movie genres such as the Rat Pack caper film, Ocean's 11. In 1959 he directed the acclaimed Pork Chop Hill, starring Gregory Peck, his final war film set during the Korean War.

Release
Serving U.S. Marines and Second World War veterans attended the film's premieres in New York and Los Angeles. Proceeds from the premieres were donated to various charities associated with the United States Marine Corps. The studio also allowed the USMC to use the film for recruitment purposes. On January 11, 1951, The Hollywood Reporter noted that a full company of Marine recruits were to be sworn in at the film's premiere in San Francisco.

References

External links
 
 
 Aveleryman Film Credits  
 

1951 films
1950s war films
20th Century Fox films
Pacific War films
Films directed by Lewis Milestone
Films about the United States Marine Corps
Films scored by Sol Kaplan
American war films
1950s English-language films
1950s American films